The following list is a non-exhaustive one of physical and electronic newspapers in Tunisia:

Printed versions
Al Chourouk (Arabic, daily)
 Assarih (Arabic, daily)
 La Presse de Tunisie (French, daily)

Electronic only
 The Tunis Times (English)
 Tunisia News
AlKabar Plus
Kapitalis
Business News
MABAPOST english | MABAPOST français | مابابوست عربي (English، French, Arabic)

Defunct

 Al Amal
 L'Alba
 La Dépêche tunisienne
 La Justice
 Es-Sabah
 Il Liberatore
 Le Renouveau 
 Le Réveil juif
 Tunis-Socialiste
 Le Tunisien

See also
 Media of Tunisia
 Television in Tunisia

References

Tunisia
Newspapers